Dayan Ghanwoloku Lake (born August 1, 1997) is a Liberian American football defensive back for the Houston Gamblers of the United States Football League (USFL). He played college football at Brigham Young University (BYU).

College career
Lake started 43 of 48 games at BYU, compiling 207 career tackles (149 solo), 10.5 tackles for loss (including two sacks), three forced fumbles, and 15 career pass breakups. He finished as BYU's all-time leader in fumble recoveries (seven), second in interception return yards (226), and fourth in interceptions with seven. After his senior season, he participated in the NFLPA Collegiate Bowl.

Professional career

Los Angeles Rams
Lake was signed as an undrafted free agent by the NFL's Los Angeles Rams on April 28, 2020. He was waived during final roster cuts on September 4, 2020.

The Spring League
Lake was selected by the Conquerors of The Spring League during its player selection draft on October 12, 2020.

New England Patriots
On December 9, 2020, Lake was signed to the practice squad of the New England Patriots, but was then released 6 days later.

Los Angeles Rams (second stint)
On June 1, 2021, Lake signed with the Los Angeles Rams. He was waivedinjured on August 5, 2021 and placed on injured reserve. On August 16, 2021 Lake was waived with an injury settlement and became a free agent.

Houston Gamblers
Lake signed with the Houston Gamblers of the USFL on November 22, 2022.

Personal life
Lake was born in Liberia. At the age of five, he traveled with his older sister, Yassah, to the United States where his father's new wife took care of them while their father played soccer at BYU-Hawaii.

References

External links
BYU Cougars football bio 
Los Angeles Rams football bio
New England Patriots football bio

Living people
American football defensive backs
BYU Cougars football players
Houston Gamblers (2022) players
Liberian players of American football
Los Angeles Rams players
New England Patriots players
People from Layton, Utah
Players of American football from Utah
The Spring League players
1997 births